The Artios Award for Outstanding Achievement in Casting - Big Budget Feature (Comedy) is an award handed out annually by the Casting Society of America. The award, in its current incarnation, was first awarded in 2010, when the category made the distinction of award comedic films with larger budgets, and studio backing. Previously, since the second awards ceremony in 1986, the category had only held the distinction of Outstanding Achievement in Feature Film Casting – Comedy. The award honors the casting directors of higher-budgeted, in comparison to independently-backed, films that the voting body believes featured the best casting.

Winners and nominees

1980s
Outstanding Achievement in Feature Film Casting

Outstanding Achievement in Feature Film Casting – Comedy

1990s

2000s

Outstanding Achievement in Casting for a Studio Feature – Comedy

Outstanding Achievement in Casting - Big Budget Feature Casting (Comedy)

2010s

References

American film awards
Casting awards